Charlie Wolfe (26 April 1892 – 8 November 1966) was an  Australian rules footballer who played with South Melbourne in the Victorian Football League (VFL).

After one season in Victoria he transferred to Western Australia where he played with Subiaco and was a member of their premiership winning side in 1915.

Notes

External links 

1892 births
1966 deaths
Australian rules footballers from Tasmania
Devonport Football Club players
Sydney Swans players
Subiaco Football Club players